Carfin railway station is a railway station serving both Carfin and Newarthill in North Lanarkshire, Scotland.

It contains two platforms; one for trains in the direction of Glasgow, and the other for trains to Edinburgh Waverley via Shotts.

Like the following stop on the Shotts Line, Holytown, the location of the station is ambiguous. It is located on the border between Carfin and Newarthill, for much of its recent history closer to a housing estate in the latter. It is now bordered immediately on both sides by housing developments.

Services 

In the opposite direction there is also an hourly service, calling at all stations except  en route to Edinburgh. 
A 2 hourly service runs on Sundays.

References

Sources

External links 

 Carfin station video history

Railway stations in North Lanarkshire
Railway stations served by ScotRail
SPT railway stations
Former London, Midland and Scottish Railway stations
Railway stations in Great Britain closed in 1930